Up on the Downs is the first solo record by the DJ Rob Smith, and his first release on the Grand Central Records independent record label.

Critical reception
Fact thought that "the unfeasibly funky breakbeat dub 'Tru Rub' is the party rocking chest-rattler of the collection, but it’s the exquisite 'Singapore' that bears the most repeat listening."

AllMusic wrote that "the same backbeats and cut-ups that made Smith and Mighty such a force to deal with are extremely evident and provide an album-length worth of moody, introspective hip hop ideal for long walks on cold winter days."

Track listing
 "Rock Dope Stupid (R & R Mix)"  – 5:53
 "Angels in Poverty" (featuring Kelz & Rudy Lee)  – 4:50
 "Revolve"  – 4:30
 "Living in Unity (Wonderful World mix)" (featuring Ghadian)  – 6:11
 "Reverie"  – 4:10
 "Great Escape"  – 4:44
 "Tru Rub"  – 4:45
 "Question (Blue & Red Rework)" (featuring Ghadian)  – 5:23 
 "Don't You See" (featuring Hazel Jayne)  – 4:31
 "Singapore"  – 3:47
 "Jah Provide"  – 4:08
 "Likeminded" (featuring Alice Perera)  – 5:30

References

2003 debut albums
Grand Central Records albums